The 2012 CAF Champions League group stage matches took place between July and September 2012. The matchdays were 6–8 July, 20–22 July, 3–5 August, 17–19 August, 31 August–2 September, and 14–16 September.

The group stage featured the eight winners from the second round. They were divided into two groups of four, where they played each other home-and-away in a round-robin format. The top two teams in each group advanced to the semifinals.

Seeding
The draw for the group stage was held on 15 May 2012, 14:00 UTC+02:00, at the CAF Headquarters in Cairo. The eight teams were seeded into four pots (using their individual 2007–2011 5-Year team Ranking). Each group contained one team from each pot.

Tiebreakers
The order of tie-breakers used when two or more teams have equal number of points is:
Number of points obtained in games between the teams concerned
Goal difference in games between the teams concerned
Away goals scored in games between the teams concerned
Goal difference in all games
Goals scored in all games

Groups

Group A

Group B

References

External links
CAF Champions League

Group stage